Larisa Yurievna Selezneva (born September 12, 1963 in Leningrad) is a Russian former pair skater who represented the Soviet Union. With her husband Oleg Makarov, she is the 1984 Olympic bronze medalist, 1985 World silver medalist, 1988 World bronze medalist, and two-time European champion (1987, 1989). They were coached by Igor Moskvin.

Career 
Selezneva trained in Leningrad (now Saint Petersburg). She was partnered with Oleg Vasiliev early in her pairs career but they split after three months.

Selezneva and Makarov were paired together by their coaches in 1978. They won the World Junior Championships in 1980 and 1981. They then rapidly progressed in the senior ranks. In 1984, they won the bronze medal at the Sarajevo Olympics, which was the first major international competition for the pair. Selezneva, along with Makarov, was awarded the Medal for Distinguished Labor (1984).

Armed with strong pairs skills and difficult side-by-side triple jumps, they won the silver medal at the 1985 World Championships in Tokyo, almost defeating the then-reigning World and Olympic champion team, Elena Valova / Oleg Vasiliev, also from the Soviet Union. Makarov broke his knee before the 1988 Winter Olympics and competed at the event with his knee in a cast and four pain-killing shots. They finished fourth at the event and won the bronze medal at the 1988 World Championships. They also won two European titles, in 1987 and 1989. They retired from competition in 1990.

Selezneva / Makarov were one of the first pairs to regularly include side-by-side triple jumps in their programs. They were coached by Igor Moskvin.

Personal life 
Selezneva and Makarov married in 1987. The family moved from Saint Petersburg, Russia to New York in 2001, having been recommended as coaches by Tamara Moskvina and Igor Moskvin. The pair coach at various rinks in New York and New Jersey.

They have two children, a daughter, Ksenia (born December 20, 1992 in Saint Petersburg), and a son, Aleksey, who was born nine years later in the United States. Their daughter became a competitive figure skater like her parents; she is the 2010 Russian national champion and represented Russia at the 2010 Winter Olympics. The pair and their daughter became naturalized U.S. citizens on August 16, 2013.

Competitive highlights 
Pairs with Oleg Makarov

Other results 
1990–1991
 World Professional Championships – 3rd
 World Challenge of Champions – 3rd
1991–1992
 World Challenge of Champions – 2nd

References

External links

Navigation 

1963 births
Living people
Soviet female pair skaters
Russian female pair skaters
Olympic figure skaters of the Soviet Union
Figure skaters at the 1984 Winter Olympics
Olympic bronze medalists for the Soviet Union
Figure skaters from Saint Petersburg
Olympic medalists in figure skating
World Figure Skating Championships medalists
European Figure Skating Championships medalists
World Junior Figure Skating Championships medalists
Medalists at the 1984 Winter Olympics